Edwina Donnelly Mitchell (1894–1968) was the Superintendent (warden) of Julia Tutwiler Prison for Women located in Wetumpka, Alabama.

Background
Originally from Autauga County, Alabama, she was a graduate of Alabama College (now University of Montevallo) and a 1946 graduate of Vanderbilt University Law School.

Alabama attorney general Harwell Goodwin Davis appointed Mitchell as Assistant Attorney General of Alabama 1922–25. She held the position again in 1939, when she wrote the legislation to create the Alabama Pardons and Parole Board. She was the first woman to serve on the board, 1939–1949.

Tutwiler
In 1951, she was appointed Superintendent of Tutwiler. She believed harsh conditions and strict measures only hardened people whose lives had led them to prison, telling an interviewer, "The attorney general used to ask me to sit in on meetings for him when I was an assistant. I went out to see the institutions we were putting people in, and I was so upset I've never lost interest in the correctional field." Instead, she housed the women in shared cells, where they were allowed some personal items in their area. Spurred by proposed state legislation to revamp the prison system, based on allegations it was a financial liability by not being self-supporting, women's clubs toured Tutwiller to observe the situation for themselves. The visitors found prisoners growing their own food, and learning the textile trade. Mitchell explained her philosophy of teaching the prisoners how to get past their own hostilities, "I believe everybody can be improved with the right kind of self discipline."

Final years and death

After reaching retirement age for a state job, Mitchell was given a waiver to continue overseeing Tutwiler. Her personal physician urged her to retire when she reached the age of 70. Although the announcement was made in January 1965, no date was set. She was hospitalized with a heart attack in January 1966, and she officially retired July 16.

Mitchell died February 4, 1968. She was elected to the Alabama Women's Hall of Fame in 1973.

References

1894 births
1968 deaths
People from Autauga County, Alabama
Vanderbilt University alumni
University of Montevallo